Nada is a town in Danzhou city, Hainan province, China. Nada was established more than 400 years ago, and has been the administrative seat and urban center of Danzhou (formerly Dan County) since 1958. It has a population of 220,000 as of 2010.

Location

History
Nada was founded more than 400 years ago with the merger of the villages of Nanian and Datong. The name Nada was formed from the first syllables of the two villages. During the early 1950s, Nada was part of the seventh district of Dan County (Danxian). Nada County was established in May 1957, with Nada Town as its seat. In December 1958, Nada County was merged into Dan County, but the seat of Dan County was moved from Xinzhou to Nada Town. The town was called Nada Commune from 1958 to 1981, and its outskirts were split off as Qianjin Commune (later Qianjin District) in 1977, but merged back into Nada in 1987.

American Christian missionaries called the town Nodoa, and established a station there in 1888.

Administrative divisions
As of 2013, Nada has 11 residential communities, 21 villages, and 8 farms under its administration.

Demographics
As of the 2010 National Census, Nada has a population of 220,000. Its residents speak a variety of languages and dialects, including Danzhou dialect, Cantonese, Hakka, Hainanese, Hlai, Miao, and Lingao. Mandarin is also widely spoken.

Economy
In 2013, Nada's GDP grew by 23.3% to 5.8 billion yuan, including 0.5 billion from the primary sector, 2.33 billion from the secondary sector, and 2.96 billion from the tertiary sector (service). The per capita disposable income for urban residents was 22,310 yuan.

Transportation
The area will be served by Danzhou Airport, an under-construction airport in approximately 25 km northeast of Nada. It will be international-class, built to handle the increasing number of tourists visiting the area.

See also
List of township-level divisions of Hainan

References

External links
 

Township-level divisions of Hainan
Danzhou